Mayrhofer is a German surname meaning "from the region of Mayrhof" in Austria. Notable people with the surname include:

Carl Mayrhofer (183782), Austrian obstetrician
Johann Mayrhofer (17871836), Austrian poet and librettist known for his friendship with Franz Schubert
Manfred Mayrhofer (19262011), Austrian linguist who specialized in Indo-Iranian languages
 Sabine Mayrhofer-Gritsch (born 1973), Austrian recurve archer
 Wolfgang Mayrhofer (born 1958), Austrian sailor who competed in the 1980 Olympic Olympics, academic in the field of management and organisational behaviour

Other uses 
 1690 Mayrhofer, an asteroid named after Austrian amateur astronomer Karl Mayrhofer (190382)

See also 
 

German-language surnames